Saka Akanni Oloko (born 10 May 1938) is a Nigerian hurdler. He competed in the men's 110 metres hurdles at the 1960 Summer Olympics.

References

External links
 

1938 births
Living people
Athletes (track and field) at the 1960 Summer Olympics
Nigerian male hurdlers
Olympic athletes of Nigeria
Place of birth missing (living people)